The MKTBT is a large circular bakelite cased Albanian anti-tank blast mine. The mine uses a mechanical pressure fuze, copied from the Russian MV-5. The mine has relatively low metal content, including a metal carrying handle and fixing brackets, as well as six screws in the top of the mine. The mine is normally colored red-brown.

The mine is found in small numbers in Kosovo and may be present in Albania.

Specifications
 Diameter: 375 mm (approx)
 Height: 140 mm (approx)
 Weight: 15 kg
 Explosive content: 12 kg of TNT

References
 Jane's Mines and Mine Clearance 2005-2006

Anti-tank mines
Military equipment of Albania